The Papagayo River is a river of Mexico.

See also
List of rivers of Mexico

References

Rivers of Mexico